The Romani people of Greece, or Romá (Greek: Ρομάνι/Ρομά), are called Tsinganoi  (Greek: Τσιγγάνοι), Athinganoi (Αθίγγανοι),  or the more derogatory term Gyftoi (Greek: Γύφτοι) (Gypsies). 
On 8 April 2019, the Greek government stated that the number of Greek Roma citizens in Greece is around 110,000. Other estimates have placed the number of Romani people resident in Greece as high as 350,000.

History

Origin
The Romani people originate from Northern India, presumably from the northwestern Indian states Rajasthan and Punjab. Linguistic evidence has shown that roots of Romani language lie in India: the language has grammatical characteristics of Indian languages and shares with them a big part of the basic lexicon, for example, body parts or daily routines.

Arrival into the Balkans
The history of Roma in Greece goes back to the 15th century. The name Gypsy (Gyftos = Γύφτος) sometimes used for the Romani people was first given to them by the Greeks, who supposed them to be Egyptian in origin. Due to their nomadic nature, they are not concentrated in a specific geographical area, but are dispersed all over the country. The majority of the Greek Roma yet are Hellenized and Orthodox Christians who speak the Romani language in addition to Greek, or the Romano-Greek language, like the Finikas Romika. There are several other Dialects spoken by the Roma In Greece, as the Agios Athanasios-Balkan Romani, the Parakalamos-Romacilikanes, or the Volos Sevlengere Roma.
Mostly Muslim Roma who live in Western Thrace adopted a Turkish Identity and speak Turkish and the Xoraxane dialect
Sedentary Roma Groups from Serres  region, believe their Ancestors was once taken from Egypt by the Ottomans in 1517 to work of the Land of Turkish Feudallords in Rumelia. Also in Evliya Çelebi's Seyahatname  of 1668, he mentioned that the Roma from Komotini (Gümülcine) swear their Ancestors came from Egypt. Banyan merchants came once via Indo-Roman trade relations and settled there for a while in Roman Egypt, so their Ancestors must be Doms in Egypt.

Migration to Turkey 
During the Population exchange between Greece and Turkey in 1923, different Muslim Turkish Roma groups from Greece, like the Tütünčides (Tobacco traders/workers) or the Sepetčides (Basketmakers) moved to Turkey, and called Mübadil Romanlar

Settlements

The Roma in Greece live scattered on the whole territory of the country, mainly in the suburbs. Notable centres of Romani life in Athens are Agia Varvara which has a very successful Romani community and Ano Liosia where conditions are poorer. Roma largely maintain their own customs and traditions. Although a large number of Roma has adopted a sedentary and urban way of living, there are still settlements in some areas. The nomads at the settlements often differentiate themselves from the rest of the population. They number 200,000 according to the Greek government. According to the National Commission for Human Rights that number is closer to 250,000 and according to the Greek Helsinki Watch group to 300,000.

As a result of neglect by the state, among other factors, the Romani communities in Greece face several problems including high rates of child labour and abuse, low school attendance, police discrimination and drug trafficking. The most serious issue is the housing problem since many Roma in Greece still live in tents, on properties they do not own, making them subject to eviction. In the past decade these issues have received wider attention and some state funding.

On two occasions, the European Committee of Social Rights found Greece in violation of the European Social Charter by its policy towards Roma in the field of housing. Furthermore, between 1998-2002, 502 Albanian Roma children disappeared from the Greek Foundation for children Agia Varvara. These cases were not investigated by the Greek authorities until the European Union forced an investigation, which only led to the recovery of 4 children. The children who were sold were presumably sold to human traffickers for sexual slavery or organ harvesting, according to a report submitted by the Greek government to the European Commission.

Religion
The majority of the Greek Roma are Orthodox Christian like the groups Medvedara (Bear-leader), Katsiveli, Fitsiria, Mandopolini etc., and have taken a Greek identity (language, names) while a small part of them, the Erli/Erlides (Greek: Ερλίδες), and Tourkogyftos are Muslim Roma concentrated in Western Thrace have adopted Turkish identities.

Notable Roma from Greece

Manolis Angelopoulos, singer
Kostas Hatzis, singer and musician
Irini Merkouri, singer
Christos Patsatzoglou, Greek international football player
Vassilis Saleas, clarinetist
Eleni Vitali, singer and composer
Sotis Volanis, singer
Lazaros Christodoulopoulos, Greek international football player
Zafeiris Melas, singer
Giorgos Giakoumakis, Greek international football player

See also
Minorities in Greece
Muslim minority in Greece

References

External links

Roma in Greece, 1999

European Committee of Social Rights case law
 
Greek Romani people
Greek people of Romani descent